Gerald Alexander Fleming (born October 16, 1966) is a Canadian former professional ice hockey forward who played 11 games in the National Hockey League for the Montreal Canadiens. Fleming also played ice hockey for the University of Prince Edward Island Panthers and the Fredericton Canadiens in the American Hockey League.

As of 2022, he served as the head coach of the ECHL's Iowa Heartlanders, the affiliate of the Minnesota Wild during the 2021-22 ECHL season. He was previously the interim coach of the Oklahoma City Barons. On July 21, 2015, he was named as the first head coach of the Bakersfield Condors in the AHL, a position he held until 2018.

He stepped down as the head coach of the Heartlanders, looking and expecting to take a job in Europe

References

External links

1967 births
Living people
Anglophone Quebec people
Bakersfield Condors coaches
Canadian ice hockey forwards
Fredericton Canadiens players
Ice hockey people from Montreal
Montreal Canadiens players
Undrafted National Hockey League players
UPEI Panthers ice hockey players
Verdun Junior Canadiens players
Verdun Juniors players
Canadian ice hockey coaches